IJPL may refer to:
International Journal of Private Law
International Journal of Persian Literature